Eric Barclay (born Erik Altberg, 1894–1938) was a Swedish film actor. Barclay became a prominent actor in French silent films of the early 1920s, often working with director Jacques de Baroncelli. He also appeared in German and British films, and those of his native Sweden.

Selected filmography
Enchantment (1920)
Judge Not (1920)
The Corner Man (1921)
Roger la Honte (1922)
Das Spielzeug von Paris (1925)
Faust (1926)
Three Cuckoo Clocks (1926)
The Glass Boat (1927)
 The Porter from Maxim's (1927)
 Tales from the Vienna Woods (1928)
The Man with the Limp (1928) 
 The Gambling Den of Montmartre (1928)
Who Invented Divorce? (1928)
The Little Match Girl (1928)
Charlotte Löwensköld (1930)
Kungliga Johansson (1934)

References

Bibliography
Powrie, Phil & Rebillard, Éric. Pierre Batcheff and Stardom in 1920s French Cinema. Edinburgh University Press, 2009.

External links

Cinea  - YEAR 1921 - 1923 -  MEDIA HISTORY DIGITAL LIBRARY
Info at Internet Archive

1894 births
1938 deaths
Swedish male film actors
Swedish male silent film actors
20th-century Swedish male actors
Swedish expatriates in France